Spud's Quest is an independent adventure platformer video game for the Microsoft Windows that draws its inspiration from the classic games of yesteryear, most notably the Dizzy, The Legend of Zelda, Tomb Raider and Metroid series. This is the first game developed by Mouldy Toof Studios, a Chris Davis' one man studio. It was made with Clickteam Fusion 2.5 (CF2.5), a video game creation tool.

Spud's Quest was first released as a short demo in October 23, 2006. Chris Davis, later decided to expand it into a larger commercial game. In October 31, 2012, Chris Davis launched a crowdfunding campaign on Kickstarter to fund a complete version of this game, with a funding goal of £5,000. This campaign was successfully funded with £6,033 on 475 backers, and 
the game was released in September 15, 2013. This game later was released for Steam in July 31, 2014.

Description 
In this game, players take on the role of Spud and his friend Prince Charming, who has been cursed by an evil wizard and turned into a frog. The pair set on a journey to uncover four ancient elemental essences that have the power to banish the evil and remove the curse. The plot draws inspiration from various fairy tales, Arthurian legend, and mythology from Greek, Norse and Mayan.

The game features pixel-art graphics and gameplay ranging between a Metroidvania and a point-and-click Adventure game, with a rich fantasy-based world full of secrets, five dungeons brimming with puzzles and enemies to explore, and plenty of characters to interact with along the way.

Reception

Spud's Quest received generally positive reviews from most reviewers.

References

External links
 Official website
 Mobygames page
2013 video games
Adventure games
Kickstarter-funded video games
Platform games
Windows games